Fuqua is a ghost town located in Liberty County, Texas, United States.

Geography
Fuqua was located 56 miles northwest of Beaumont, Texas in the northeastern corner of Liberty County, Texas. The old site of Fuqua is located in the thick woods off of Farm Road 787 (today, the road is named County Road 2650). The elevation is 115 ft (about 35 m).

References

Ghost towns in East Texas
Unincorporated communities in Texas
Former cities in Texas